Chezelles may refer to:

Chezelles, Indre, in the Indre department
Chezelles, Indre-et-Loire, in the Indre-et-Loire department

See also
Chezelle